Glycomyces albus is a bacterium from the genus of Glycomyces which has been isolated from hypersaline soil from Lop Nur in China.

References 

Actinomycetia
Bacteria described in 2014